Sherifatu Sumaila (born 30 November 1996) is a Ghanaian professional footballer who plays as an attacking midfielder and a attacker for Spanish Primera Federación club Rayo Vallecano. She previously played for Djurgårdens IF Fotboll (women). She is also a former player for USA United Women's Soccer side, LA Galaxy Orange County. Sherifatu is a member of the Ghana women's national football team, the Black Queens.

Education 
Sherifatu Graduated from Feather River Community College in Quincy, California.

References

External links
Sherifatu Sumaila at BDFútbol

Profile at Swedish Football Association 

1996 births
Living people
People from Tamale, Ghana
Ghanaian women's footballers
Women's association football forwards
Feather River College alumni
College women's soccer players in the United States
University of Maine at Fort Kent alumni
California Storm players
Djurgårdens IF Fotboll (women) players
Mallbackens IF players
F.C. Kiryat Gat (women) players
Rayo Vallecano Femenino players
Women's Premier Soccer League players
Damallsvenskan players
Ligat Nashim players
Segunda Federación (women) players
Ghana women's international footballers
Ghanaian expatriate women's footballers
Ghanaian expatriate sportspeople in the United States
Expatriate women's soccer players in the United States
Ghanaian expatriate sportspeople in Sweden
Expatriate women's footballers in Sweden
Ghanaian expatriate sportspeople in Israel
Expatriate women's footballers in Israel
Ghanaian expatriate sportspeople in Spain
Expatriate women's footballers in Spain
Dagomba people
Primera Federación (women) players